The South Carolina Independent School Association (SCISA) is a school accrediting organization.  It was founded in South Carolina in 1965 to legitimize segregation academies.

History
SCISA was founded on August 10, 1965 with seven member schools and provided organizational support to new segregation academies similar to that provided by White Citizens Councils in Mississippi, and had already founded 26 segregation academies by the spring of 1966. Its first executive director was Tom Turnipseed. Turnipseed admitted that SCISA was founded to support a white-only education system. "We denied it had anything to do with integration, but it did. It was fear. It was racism." SCISA was founded as a "haven for segregation academies" but by 1990, according to then executive director Larry Watt, the "great majority" of SCISA's then 70 member schools were no longer segregated by race. Another founder, T.E. Wannamaker also stated that the organization was a response to mass integration and that "Many (Negroes) are little more than field hands."

Athletics
SCISA governs student athletics for its member institutions.

Structure
SCISA is structured into 3 divisions, based on school population and size of teams. The levels, from smallest population to largest, are A, AA, and AAA. A and AA sports are further split into 2 regions each, while AAA competes without region differences.

References

Further reading
Independent Schools Letter to the editor of the News and Courier by Tom Turnipseed, April 11, 1966

External links
SCISA official website

Private and independent school organizations in the United States
Segregation academies in South Carolina
Organizations established in 1965